Rhynchospora megaplumosa, the Manatee beaksedge, is a plant species endemic to a small region in central Florida. It is known from only 4 Counties: Polk, Hillsboro, Manatee and Sarasota. It generally grows on sandy soil in pine woodlands.

Rhynchospora megaplumosa is a perennial herb up to 90 cm tall, often forming clumps. Culms are round in cross-section. Spikelets are densely crowded together, tapering at both ends, light brown, about 9 mm long, with bristles nearly twice as long as the fruit, sticking out of the spikelet and giving a feathery appearance.

References

megaplumosa
Plants described in 2000
Endemic flora of Florida
Flora without expected TNC conservation status